Honourable Chief Justice Muhammad Haleem, LL.D. (HC), HI (1 January 1925 – 11 August 2006) was a Pakistani jurist who served as the 10th Chief Justice of Pakistan from 1981 to 1989, the longest serving Chief Justice in the history of the judicial branch in Pakistan. He was even endorsed by successive future regimes in Pakistan.

Early life
Born in Lucknow, British India, he was the son of Barrister Muhammad Wasim, the first Advocate General of Pakistan, and the pre-independence Advocate General of Uttar Pradesh.

Chief Justice of Pakistan
He was the chief justice of Pakistan from 25 March 1981 to 31 December 1989. As Chief Justice of Pakistan, he wrote the famous judgment in Benazir Bhutto's court case which made the holding of 1988 Pakistani general election possible. On 15 September 2006, paying tribute to Justice Haleem, Chief Justice of Pakistan in 2006, Iftikhar Muhammad Chaudhry observed that Justice Haleem, without fear and favor, had helped Pakistan, with his judgment, get back on rails of parliamentary democracy in 1988.

Education
BSc, LL.B degrees, Lucknow University (1946), and LL.D (Honoris Causa) degree – Karachi University (1990).

Awards
He was awarded Hilal-i-Imtiaz in 1996 by the Government of Pakistan.

Positions held
 Pleader
 Assistant Advocate General (1963)
 Judge, High Court of West Pakistan (1969)
 Judge, Supreme Court of Pakistan (1977)
 Chief Justice of Pakistan (1981–1989)
 Chairman, Pakistan Law Commission
 Chairman, Indus Water Commission
 Chairman, Supreme Judicial Council
 acted as President of Pakistan on several occasions during 1981–1984

Publications
Work papers on:
 The Proper Role of the International Court of Justice in the Law of the World Eleventh Conference of the World Peace through Law, Cairo, Egypt, September 1983
 The Challenge of Social Justice: The Third International Conference of Appellate Judges, New Delhi, India, 5–8 March 1984
 Intellectual Property Issues in Pakistan: International Property Colloquium of Judges in Asia and the Pacific, held under the auspices of the World Intellectual Property Organization at Sydney (Australia), 8–12 October 1984
 The Advisory Jurisdiction of the International Court of Justice: Twelfth Conference of The World Peace Through Law Center, West Berlin, Federal Republic of Germany, 21–26 July 1985
 The Development of Deep Sea Resources: Twelfth Conference of the World Peace Through Law Center, West Berlin, Federal Republic of Germany, 21–26 July 1985
 Management of Supreme Court: Lawasia Conference of the Chief Justices on Management of Courts, Penang, Malaysia, 19–22 August 1985
 Public Interest Litigation – Is it an Unruly Horse? Ninth Lawasia Conference, New Delhi, India, 7–12 October 1985
 Law, Justice and Society: Fifth Pakistan Jurists Conference, Karachi, 28–30 March 1986
 The Judiciary and the Intellectual Property System: Regional Forum of Judges organized jointly by the World Intellectual Property Organization (WIPO) and the Judges of the Supreme Court of Pakistan in Association with the Law Association for Asia and the Western Pacific (LAWASIA) and with the assistance of the United Nations Development Program (UNDP), Islamabad, 5 to 9 October 1986
 Court as the Guardian of the Constitution: Fourth International Conference of Appellate Judges, Kuala Lumpur, Malaysia, 20–24 April 1987
 Protecting and Expanding the Jurisdiction of the International Court of Justice: Thirteenth Biennial World Conference, Seoul, Republic of Korea, 6–11 September 1987
 Transnational Terrorism: Thirteenth Biennial World Conference, Seoul, Republic of Korea, 6–11 September 1987
 Address Delivered at the Second Conference of the Chief Justices of the LAWASIA region - South East Asian and the Western Pacific Countries, Islamabad, 18–22 October 1987
 The Domestic Application of International Human Rights Norms: Judicial Colloquium held under the auspices of the Commonwealth Secretariat, London, at Bangalore, India, 24–26 February 1988
 Permanent Sovereignty and International Responsibility: International Symposium on Legal Aspects of New International Economic Order, held at Islamabad, Pakistan, 14 March 1989

See also
Chief Justices of Pakistan
Supreme Court of Pakistan
List of Pakistanis

References

1925 births
2006 deaths
Scholars from Lucknow
University of Lucknow alumni
20th-century Indian lawyers
Muhajir people
People from Karachi
University of Karachi alumni
Pakistan Navy officers
Pakistani lawyers
Chief justices of Pakistan
Recipients of Hilal-i-Imtiaz
Pakistani judges
Pakistani scholars